The Norway national under-21 speedway team is the national under-21 motorcycle speedway team of Norway and is controlled by the Norwegian Motorsport Federation. The team took part in the Under-21 World Cup for the first and only time in 2005. Rune Holta won two medals in Individual competition (silver in 1994 and bronze in 1993).

Competition

See also 
 Norway national speedway team

External links 
 (no) Norwegian Motorsport Federation webside

National speedway teams
Speedway
Team